Hurst Performance, Inc. of Warminster Township, Pennsylvania, manufactured and marketed products for enhancing the performance of automobiles, most notably muscle cars.

Products
Hurst produced aftermarket replacement manual transmission shifters and other automobile performance enhancing parts.

Hurst was also an Original Equipment Manufacturer (OEM) supplier for automakers and provided services or components for numerous muscle car models by American Motors (AMC), Ford, Chrysler, and General Motors. Their products were included as standard equipment in AMC's The Machine (also known as the Rebel Machine), AMC AMXs and Javelins, Chevrolet Camaros, Pontiac Firebirds, Pontiac GTOs and Oldsmobile 442s, Boss Mustang 302 and the Boss 429, as well as Dodge Chargers, Plymouth Barracudas, and Plymouth Superbirds, among others.

Specialty automobile models produced in cooperation with automakers that incorporated the Hurst logo or name, included:
 1969 AMC SC/Rambler
 1970 Chrysler Hurst 300
 1971 Hurst Jeepster
1971-‘72 Pontiac Grand Prix SSJ
 1972 Hurst Oldsmobile Pace Car (Unique, manufactured by Hurst for Indy Race Day, copied at Oldsmobile dealerships)
 Several Oldsmobile Hurst/Olds models

Hurst Performance was also the inventor of the "Jaws of Life—a hydraulic rescue tool. It designed a complete Hurst Rescue System in the early 1970s, a specialty Emergency Medical Services (EMS) apparatus. Based on the AMC Gremlin, it served as a quicker and more compact emergency vehicle compared to the traditional heavy rescue vehicles used at motorsport race tracks and as a companion vehicle to highway emergency systems.

History 

Hurst Performance was originally named Hurst-Campbell. The company was established in 1958 as an auto repair shop when George Hurst and Bill Campbell were both young men. The original shop was located on Glenside Ave. in Glenside, Pennsylvania. They later moved to a large building on the corner of Street Road and Jacksonville Road in Warminster, PA. An older man named Lawrence Greenwald (who is credited, among other things, as one of the inventors of stretch nylon hosiery), took certain cars from his collection to Hurst's shop for repair. Greenwald saw promise in Hurst and Campbell and decided to finance them in a venture to manufacture large aftermarket bumpers for VW buses, which were becoming increasingly popular.

When Volkswagen began manufacturing its own large bumpers for the buses, Hurst-Campbell branched out into the piston-driven gearshift business. They also manufactured, at various times, engine mounts, wheels, and shift knobs in addition to its line of gearshifts.

The company's research department developed and invented the Jaws of Life. The product was spun off and sold separately when it was owned by Dick Chrysler.

By the early 1960s, Hurst transmission shifters and other products had become legendary in auto racing, particularly in drag racing, and among custom car makers. Many automobile enthusiasts replaced flimsy factory shifters (and steering column shifters, as well) with Hurst floor shifters to obtain better control of gear selection, particularly for competitive driving. As automotive historian Mike Mueller noted, "If you didn't have a Hurst shifter in your supercar, you were a mild-mannered loser." General Motors' official policy up to that time had prohibited the use of the names of outside vendors on GM products. Pontiac Division manager Elliot "Pete" Estes convinced the corporation that having the Hurst name on its cars' shifters would be an effective sales tool. Various Pontiac models had already been equipped with Hurst shifters from the factory, but the Hurst name did not actually appear on Pontiac shifters until 1965.

George Hurst expanded into other specialty performance products during the 1960s by acquiring Schiefer Manufacturing, a manufacturer of clutches and Airheart, which manufactured brake systems.

In 1968, Greenwald and Hurst took the company public. The company was acquired in 1970 by Sunbeam Products, a manufacturer of small appliances. Hurst was promised an executive position and seat on the board of directors as part of the buyout, but Sunbeam did not follow through. (According to one variation of this account, Sunbeam specifically informed Mr. Greenwald and Mr. Hurst that they would no longer be affiliated with the company.) Greenwald fully retired at age 67.

George Hurst died in 1986. Lawrence Greenwald died of natural causes in 1986.

In 1987, the Hurst operations were sold by Sunbeam and became part of the Mr. Gasket Company. In 2007, B&M Racing and Performance Products bought the Hurst brand.

Today 
A subsidiary, established in 2008, called Hurst Performance Vehicles, is responsible for creating new renditions of Hurst vehicles that include the Hurst Challenger, Hurst Viper, and the Hurst Camaro.

See also
 Linda Vaughn, "Miss Hurst Golden Shifter"

References

External links
 
 www.hurst-shifters.com — Official site

American Motors
Auto parts suppliers of the United States
Automotive accessories
Automotive motorsports and performance companies